The 2022 Women's National League known as the SSE Airtricity WNL for sponsorship reasons, was the 12th season of the Women's National League, the highest women's association football league in the Republic of Ireland since its establishment in 2011. Expansion team Sligo Rovers competed for the first time, bringing the league up to ten clubs. Shelbourne, as defending champions from the previous season, won the 2022 league by defeating Wexford Youths on the final day of the season.

In July 2022 Shelbourne announced the signing of highly-decorated United States international player Heather O'Reilly, who emerged from retirement after two years. The transfer brought substantial publicity and increased the profile of the league.

Teams

Personnel and kits

Note: Flags indicate national team as has been defined under FIFA eligibility rules. Players may hold more than one non-FIFA nationality.

Managerial changes

Format
The ten teams played each other three times, with a mid-season break from 12 June to 1 July 2022.

League table

Standings

Positions by round

The table lists the positions of teams after each week of matches. In order to preserve chronological evolvements, any postponed matches are not included to the round at which they were originally scheduled, but added to the full round they were played immediately afterwards.

Results

Matches 1–24

Teams play each other twice.

Matches 19–27
Teams play each other once.

Statistics

Top scorers
As of 30 October 2022.

Source: Women's National League

Awards

Monthly awards

Annual awards

Broadcasting
In February 2021 the Football Association of Ireland announced that all WNL matches would be streamed free of charge on the new LOITV platform. In February 2022 the TG4 Irish language television network confirmed an intention to broadcast nine WNL matches in 2022. Ultimately 10 games were broadcast live, which attracted over 500,000 viewers.

See also
 2022 FAI Women's Cup

Notes

References

External links 
 

Women's National League (Ireland) seasons
Ireland
Ireland
Women
1